José Pérez Adán (born 1952 in Cartagena, Spain) is a Spanish sociologist. He holds a teaching and research position in Sociology at the University of Valencia (Spain). He is a charter member of the Valencian Institute of Fertility, Sexuality and Family Relations (IVAF) and of the Inter-American Foundation for Science and Life. He is a co-founder and board member of the Latin-American Association of Communitarianism (AIC). He presides over the Spanish chapter of the Society for the Advancement of Socioeconomics, and is general coordinator of the Free International University of the Americas (ULIA). He does research and teaches on Socioeconomics, Communitarianism, Family Relations, and Environmental Studies, and is the principal Spanish language popularizer of the thought of Amitai Etzioni.

Education
Pérez Adán obtained his doctorate (PhD) at Macquarie University (Sydney, Australia).

Works 
Author until 2008 of 40 books and 100 scientific articles. Among his published works the following stand out:

Sociología: concepto y usos. Pamplona: Eunsa, 1997 
Socioeconomía. Madrid: Trotta, 1997 
Sociedad y Medio Ambiente. Madrid: Trotta, 1999 
La Salud Social. Madrid: Trotta, 1999 
Desarrollo Socioeconómico y Evolución Demográfica. Pamplona: Eunsa, 1999 
Las Terceras Vías. Madrid: Eiunsa, 2001 
Pensar la familia. Madrid: Palabra, 2001 
Diez Temas de Sociología. Madrid: Eiunsa, 2002 
Rebeldías. Madrid: Sekotia, 2002 
Comunitarismo. Madrid: Sekotia, 2003 
Sociología de la Familia y de la Sexualidad. Valencia: Edicep, 2004 
Repensar la Familia. Madrid: Eiunsa, 2005 
Cine y Sociedad: Prácticas de Ciencias Sociales. Madrid: Eiunsa, 2006 
Sociología del desarrollo sostenible. Valencia: Edicep, 2005 
Sociología: Comprender la Humanidad en el Siglo XXI. Madrid: Eiunsa, 2006 
Adiós Estado, bienvenida Comunidad. Madrid: Eiunsa, 2008

References 

José Pérez Adán UV
Prologue to biography of Amitai Etzioni
“ A Spanish Viewpoint on Communitarianism ”
“ The Community: making visible the invisible ”.
Family and the politics of community life

External links 
Latin-American Association of Comunitarianism
Spanish Chapter of SASE
Free International University of the Americas
Inter-American Foundation Science and Life

See also 
Socioeconomics
Communitarianism

Spanish non-fiction writers
Living people
1952 births